Scout Media is an integrated sports publishing company that produces Internet content covering hundreds of professional and college teams across America. The company was founded in 2001 and was acquired by Fox Sports in 2005. In 2013, Fox Sports sold Scout to North American Membership Group which later rebranded to Scout Media. Scout filed for Chapter 11 bankruptcy in December 2016 and was then acquired by CBS Corporation (now Paramount Global) in February 2017 for $9.5 million after submitting the only bid for the bankrupt company.

Internet publishing
The Internet publishing division consists of a network of over 300 web sites that publish inside and exclusive content focusing on high school, college, Fantasy Sports and professional team sports. The network is managed on the 247 platform publishing technology that allows publishers to rapidly write, cross-reference, distribute and syndicate stories and information about sports from anywhere in the world.

References

External links
 Scout.com Network

American sport websites
Online publishing companies of the United States
CBS Interactive websites
CBS Sports